The WWE SmackDown Tag Team Championship is a professional wrestling world tag team championship contested in WWE on the SmackDown brand. Unveiled on the August 23, 2016 episode of SmackDown, it was created to be the counterpart title to the then-WWE Tag Team Championship, which became exclusive to Raw as a result of the 2016 WWE draft and was subsequently renamed to Raw Tag Team Championship. 

The championship is generally contested in professional wrestling matches, in which participants execute scripted finishes rather than contend in direct competition. The inaugural champions were Heath Slater and Rhyno, who won the title in a tournament final at Backlash on September 11, 2016. The Usos (Jey Uso and Jimmy Uso) are the current champions in their fifth reign, both as a team and individually. They defeated Rey and Dominik Mysterio on July 18, 2021 during the Money in the Bank Kickoff pre-show. After winning the Raw Tag Team Championship on the May 20, 2022, episode ofSmackDown, The Usos are recognized as the Undisputed WWE Tag Team Champions.

The team of Heath Slater and Rhyno were the inaugural champions. The New Day's Kofi Kingston and Xavier Woods have the most reigns at seven, both as a team and individually, and their seventh is the shortest reign for the title at 3 days (2 days as recognized by WWE); during their first six reigns, Big E was also recognized as champion under the Freebird Rule. The Usos (Jey Uso and Jimmy Uso) have the longest singular reign at + days for their ongoing fifth reign, and they have the longest combined reign at + days. The oldest champion is Shane McMahon, winning the title at 49 years old, while the youngest is Dominik Mysterio when he won it at 24.

Title history

Reigns

Combined reigns 

By team

By wrestler

Notes

See also 
 Tag team championships in WWE

References

External links 
 Official WWE SmackDown Tag Team Championship Title History

WWE tag team champion lists
WWE SmackDown